Dorchester High School is a defunct secondary school that was located in Dorchester, Boston, United States from 1852 to 2003.

History
Dorchester High School was founded in 1852 in what was then the independent town of Dorchester, Massachusetts. In 1870, Dorchester was annexed by the City of Boston and Dorchester High came under the jurisdiction of Boston Public Schools. When a new school building on Peacevale Road opened in 1925, the student body was split. Dorchester High for Boys moved to the new facility, while Dorchester High School for Girls remained in the Codman Square building. In a Boston School Committee vote in 1953, the school again became co-educational when the Dorchester High School for Girls was closed.
The school existed until 2003, when it was closed by the Boston School Committee to create the Dorchester Education Complex.

Locations
 1852–1901 Dorchester Avenue at Centre Street
 1901–1925 Talbot Avenue, Codman Square
 1925–2003 Peacevale Road

Notable alumni
 Ray Bolger, dancer, actor, starring as the Scarecrow in the Wizard of Oz (1920)
 Frank Coombs, California legislator, U.S. congressman, U.S. Minister to Japan
 Norm Crosby, TV comedian
 Childe Hassam, Impressionist painter
 Aldro Hibbard, plein air painter
 Rose Fitzgerald Kennedy, mother of President John F. Kennedy and three U.S. Senators (1906)
 Otto P. Snowden, founder of Freedom House

References

External links

 
  - Boston Public Schools

High schools in Boston
Educational institutions established in 1852
Educational institutions disestablished in 2003
Public high schools in Massachusetts
1852 establishments in Massachusetts
2003 disestablishments in Massachusetts
Dorchester, Boston